Aeromicrobium halocynthiae is a Gram-positive, non-spore-forming, aerobic, rod-shaped and non-motile bacterium from the genus Aeromicrobium which has been isolated from the sea pineapple (Halocynthia roretzi) from the coast of Gangneungon, Korea. Aeromicrobium halocynthiae produces taurocholic acid.

References 

Propionibacteriales
Bacteria described in 2010